The Diocese of Nsukka is a Latin Church ecclesiastical territory or diocese of the Catholic Church located in the city of Nsukka, Nigeria. The Diocese of Nsukka is a suffragan diocese in the ecclesiastical province of the metropolitan Archdiocese of Onitsha.

The Diocese of Nsukka has partnered with the Archdiocese of Chicago's Office of Catholic Schools in Chicago, Illinois, in the United States, in order to provide further training and formation and improved organization to the Diocese of Nsukka's schools staff.

History
Originally, Nsukka was merely the name of the descendants of Asadu Ideke Alumona, which later became, not only the administrative Headquarters of the British Colonial powers, but also the nerve centre of the Catholic Church of the entire northern part of Igbo land.

Today, the name Nsukka is used to designate the political, cultural and religious identity of the entire people of this zone. What is currently known as the Nsukka political zone coincides with the most populous and promising zone created out of the Catholic Diocese of Enugu, which has become the Catholic Diocese of Nsukka. The consolidation of faith in this Diocese underwent a gradual process.

In 1932, Bishop Shanahan, transferred James Mellet from Ogoja to Nsukka to become the first Catholic Parish Priest of Nsukka. As at that time, Nsukka was more extensive in area than the present Nsukka Diocese, because it included the eight communities of Ayamelum now in Anambra State, Odoru and Akpanya now in Kogi State.

The creation of the new Parish out of Eke Parish was the culmination of over two decades of hard labour and toil by Christian missionaries, mostly from Ireland, to evangelize this vastly populated area of the most northern Igbo communities that eventually became the Diocese of Nsukka.

Even though Aloysius Muller and other priests from Aguleri Parish were among the first to bring Good News to Nsukka area; Uvuru and other parts of Igbo Oda in 1910, the credit for sowing the seeds of evangelization of Nsukka area should go to the priests from Eke Parish led by Vincent Davey. On the invitation of Chief Atama Nwamba, Fr. Davey visited Eha-Alumona in 1920 and built a rest house.

In 1919 a Catholic mission house and school was opened. From here the missionaries spread their work to other parts of Nsukka through the establishment of schools. Catholic primary schools were established at Uvuru (1912), Ogurugu (1919), Eha-Amufu (1919), Eha-Alumona (1919), Nkpologu (1920), Aku (1922), Nsukka (1922), Akiyi-Umulokpa (1923), Iheaka (1926), Adaba (1927), Enugu-Ezike (1930). The existence of a school meant the existence of the Catholic Church and therefore a permanent forum for recruitment and evangelization of the people.

With the zeal of Mellet the Church spread like wild fire to all the comers of the then Nsukka Division.

Mellet was assisted by Hugh Kuster 1937–1929, Philip Judge 1939-1942 and two Igbo Catechists Simon Okoye (who later became Rev Brother Okoye) and Rev. Brother Vincent Enujuba.

In 1940 Joseph Horgan succeeded Mellet and was in-charge of the Parish until 1965. Under Horgan more parishes were created out of Nsukka parish: Obollo-Eke parish, about 1954 with Patrick Grogan as Parish Priest; Aku Parish, about 1952, with Micheal Eneja as Parish Priest, who was immediately succeeded by Denis O'keeffe; Enugu-Ezike parish, about 1956 with Desmond McGlade as parish priest; Isi-Enu parish, about 1960 with Bernard Heerey as Parish Priest; Umulokpa parish, about 1961 with  Enright as Parish Priest; Ibagwa-Nkwo parish, about 1956 with John Quin as Parish Priest.

In 1956, Peter Meze Idigo took over what was left of Nsukka parish from Horgan. Under him three more parishes were created, viz, Nimbo about 1966 with Hughes as Parish Priest, Ehamufu about 1970 with Simeon Ugwu as Parish Priest, and Ovoko about 1972 with J. Ojiako as Parish Priest.

The growth and spread of the Church in Nsukka, in terms of area, population, infrastructure and refinement, was not as easy as narrated above but resulted from many years of arduous planning, toiling, competition, challenges and execution, it took 19 years for instance for the first parish, St. Martin de Pores, Obollo-Eke to be created out of St. Theresa's parish Nsukka.

The engine of evangelization was grinding gradually but steadily towards a total spread of Christianity in Nsukka area. It took a whole 59 years for the total number of parishes in Nsukka to rise to 27 by 1991. However, in recent time, the pace seems to have accelerated.

The impact of this missionary drive was not limited to the spiritual sphere alone; it also made its in-road into the health apostolate. The Catholic Church believes in the restoration of the health not only of sick souls but also bodies. In 1938 Bishop Charles Heerey established a maternity clinic at Nsukka to serve all the areas that now belong to Nsukka Diocese.

This is the clinic which later became a full-fledged hospital, and was named after Bishop Joseph Shanahan in 1943. Presently, our Diocese is blessed with four health institutions: Bishop Shanahan Hospital, Nsukka; Our Lady Health of the Sick Maternity Hospital, Adani; Queen of Peace Maternity House, Ugbene Ajima; DDL Health Centre and Maternity, Umabor Eha-Akumona, and an annex of Bishop Shanahan Hospital at St. Mary's Parish, Enugu-Ezike.

In 1985, Michael U Eneja raised Nsukka to the status of a deanery with George Dine as the deanery head. Five years later, this deanery became a diocese. The Catholic Diocese of Nsukka was carved out of Enugu Diocese on 19 November 1990 by Pope John Paul II.

Francis Emmanuel Ogbonnaya Okobo was consecrated her First Bishop on 6 January 1991 at St. Peter's Basilica, Rome and installed on 2 February 1999 at St. Theresa's Cathedral, Nsukka as the first bishop of Nsukka Diocese. Bishop Francis Okobo reigned until 13 April 2013 when Pope Francis appointed Godfrey Igwebuike Onah as the second bishop of Nsukka Diocese.

He was both consecrated and installed as the Second Bishop of Nsukka Diocese on 4 July 2013 at St. Theresa's Cathedral Nsukka by His Eminence John Cardinal O. Onaiyekan.

The Diocese covers the land area of seven local government areas that make up Nsukka cultural zone, viz, Igbo Etiti, Igboeze North, Igboeze South, Isiuzo, Nsukka, Udenu and Uzo Uwani. It stretches from Ukehe in the South to Ette in the North and from Eha-Amufu in the East to Ogurugu in the West.

The number of parishes has risen from 27 in 1991 to 144 in 2014, giving a growth rate of 253 percent per year. The growth rate is phenomenal when compared with the growth rate of 46 percent per year from 1932 to 1991. This is an index of the advantages in a new Diocese.

Today, in 2014, the number of incardinated priests of the Diocese has risen to 241, and many priests incardinated into other Dioceses. From the record available to us, there are about 76 professed religious women, and 5 Professed religious men, about 205 major Seminarians, about 342 minor Seminarians, about 732 Catechists, and a Catholic population of about 490,525.

There are many religious houses in the Diocese including; Holy Ghost Congregation, Discalced Carmelites, Brothers of St. Stephen, St. Joseph's Monastic Community, Daughters of Divine Love Sisters, Immaculate Heart Sisters, Holy Rosary Sisters, University Sisters of Assumption, Carmelite Missionary Sisters and Sisters Servants of the Visitation, Sisters of Perpetual Eucharistic Adoration, and Tersian Sisters.

Also present in the Diocese is the Prelature of Opus Dei, situated at Amaogbo lane off Ibagwa road.

In all, Nsukka Diocese is administered in thirteen deaneries: Nsukka, Adani, Aku, Enugu-Ezike, Ibagwa-Aka, Ibagwa-Ani, Obollo-Afor, Ikem, Aji, Obollo-Eke, Orba, Ukehe and Eha-alumona.

The number of Church institutions has also grown larger: Nursery Schools - 65 and Primary Schools - 68, 30 Post-primary Schools, 2 Vocational Centres, 1 Minor Seminary, 1 Spiritual Year Seminary, 1 Major Seminary (School of Philosophy), 4 Health Institutions and 1 Retreat and Conference Centre.

Special churches
The Cathedral is Saint Theresa Cathedral in Nsukka.

Leadership
 Bishops of Nsukka (Roman rite)
 Bishop Francis Emmanuel Ogbonna Okobo (1990-2013)
 Bishop Godfrey Igwebuike Onah (since 4 July 2013)

See also
Roman Catholicism in Nigeria

References

External links
 Brief History

External links
 GCatholic.org Information
 Catholic Hierarchy
 Welcome to Catholic Diocese of Nsukka

Roman Catholic dioceses in Nigeria
Christian organizations established in 1990
Roman Catholic dioceses and prelatures established in the 20th century
Roman Catholic Ecclesiastical Province of Onitsha